Renewable Agriculture and Food Systems is an academic journal published by Cambridge University Press on sustainable agriculture. It was formerly known as the American Journal of Alternative Agriculture. It is published quarterly. Its 2008 Volume 23 is its first special free-access edition. As of 2013, the editor-in-chief is Rick Welsh of Syracuse University.

References

External links
Renewable Agriculture and Food Systems homepage

Agricultural journals
Cambridge University Press academic journals